The 1989–90 Irish Cup was the 110th edition of Northern Ireland's premier football knock-out cup competition. It began on 20 January 1990 and concluded on 5 May 1990 with the final.

Ballymena United were the defending champions after winning their 6th Irish Cup last season, defeating Larne 1–0 in the 1989 final. However, this season they went out in the first round to Dungannon Swifts. Glentoran went on to win the cup for the fifth time in six seasons, and 15th time overall. They defeated Portadown 3–0 in the final.

Results

First round

|}

Replays

|}

Second round

|}

Replays

|}

Third round
With the exception of the below teams, all other winning teams from the second round were given a bye into the fourth round.

|}

Replays

|}

Fourth round

|}

Replay

|}

Fifth round

|}

Replays

|}

Sixth round

|}

Quarter-finals

|}

Semi-finals

|}

Final

References

1989–90
1989–90 domestic association football cups
Cup